Dalhousie may refer to:

Buildings
Dalhousie Castle, a castle near Bonnyrigg, Scotland
Dalhousie Obelisk, a monument in Empress Place, Singapore
Dalhousie Station (Montreal), a former passenger rail station in Montreal, Quebec
Dalhousie station (Calgary), a LRT station in Calgary, Alberta

Institutions
 Dalhousie Hilltop School, Dalhousie, India
Dalhousie School, a former prep school in Scotland
Dalhousie University, located in Halifax, Nova Scotia
HMIS (later INS) Dalhousie, the initial name of INS Angre, the naval base at Mumbai, India

Ships
 Dalhousie, later name of

People and clans
Clan Ramsay (Dalhousie), a branch of the main line of Scottish Ramsays
Earl of Dalhousie, a title created in the Peerage of Scotland in 1633
James Broun-Ramsay, 1st Marquess of Dalhousie, (1812–1860) a Governor-General of India
George Ramsay, 9th Earl of Dalhousie, a Governor of Nova Scotia and of British North America

Places

Australia
County of Dalhousie, Victoria
County of Dalhousie (South Australia)
Dalhousie Springs, South Australia, a group of natural artesian springs
Dalhousie Station (South Australia), a pastoral lease in the far north of South Australia

Canada
Dalhousie, New Brunswick, a town in Restigouche County
Dalhousie Parish, New Brunswick
Dalhousie, Calgary, a neighbourhood in the northwest area of the city
Dalhousie, Quebec, a small town in south-western Quebec
Port Dalhousie, Ontario, a community in St. Catharines
West Dalhousie, a community in Nova Scotia
Dalhousie Road, Nova Scotia, a community

India
Dalhousie, India, a town in Himachal Pradesh
Dalhousie Cantonment, a cantonment town in Himachal Pradesh
Dalhousie (Vidhan Sabha constituency), which includes the previous two towns
Dalhousie Square, former name of the B. B. D. Bagh central business district of Kolkata

Scotland
Dalhousie Mains, near Dalkeith and Bonnyrigg, former terminus of the Edinburgh and Dalkeith Railway

Sri Lanka
Dalhousie, Sri Lanka, a town in Nuwara Eliya District

See also
Dalhousie Station (disambiguation)